The 1989 Players Championship was a golf tournament in Florida on the PGA Tour, held  at TPC Sawgrass in Ponte Vedra Beach, southeast of Jacksonville. It was the sixteenth Players Championship. 

In gusty conditions, Tom Kite won the title at 279 (−9), one stroke ahead of runner-up Chip Beck.

Defending champion Mark McCumber finished four strokes back, in a tie for sixth place.

Venue

Field
Fulton Allem, Isao Aoki, George Archer, Tommy Armour III, Paul Azinger, Ian Baker-Finch, Dave Barr, Andy Bean, Chip Beck, Jim Benepe, Ronnie Black, Phil Blackmar, Jay Don Blake, Bill Britton, Mark Brooks, Billy Ray Brown, Brad Bryant, Curt Byrum, Tom Byrum, Mark Calcavecchia, Rex Caldwell, David Canipe, Jim Carter, Chen Tze-chung, Bobby Clampett, Keith Clearwater, Lennie Clements, Russ Cochran, John Cook, Fred Couples, Ben Crenshaw, Mike Donald, Bob Eastwood, David Edwards, Dave Eichelberger, Steve Elkington, Brad Fabel, Brad Faxon, Ed Fiori, Raymond Floyd, Dan Forsman, David Frost, Jim Gallagher Jr., Buddy Gardner, Bob Gilder, Bill Glasson, Wayne Grady, David Graham, Hubert Green, Ken Green, Jay Haas, Gary Hallberg, Dan Halldorson, Jim Hallet, Donnie Hammond, Morris Hatalsky, Mark Hayes, Lon Hinkle, Scott Hoch, Mike Hulbert, John Huston, Hale Irwin, Peter Jacobsen, Steve Jones, Tom Kite, Kenny Knox, Gary Koch, Bernhard Langer, Wayne Levi, Bruce Lietzke, Bob Lohr, Davis Love III, Mark Lye, Sandy Lyle, Andrew Magee, John Mahaffey, Roger Maltbie, Dick Mast, Billy Mayfair, Blaine McCallister, John McComish, Mark McCumber, Rocco Mediate, Johnny Miller, Larry Mize, Gil Morgan, Jodie Mudd, Tsuneyuki Nakajima, Larry Nelson, Jack Nicklaus, Greg Norman, Tim Norris, Andy North, Mark O'Meara, David Ogrin, Masashi Ozaki, Jerry Pate, Steve Pate, Corey Pavin, Calvin Peete, Chris Perry, Kenny Perry, Dan Pohl, Don Pooley, Nick Price, Tom Purtzer, Sam Randolph, Don Reese, Mike Reid, Larry Rinker, Loren Roberts, Bill Rogers, Clarence Rose, Dave Rummells, Bill Sander, Gene Sauers, Ted Schulz, Tom Sieckmann, Scott Simpson, Tim Simpson, Joey Sindelar, Jeff Sluman, J. C. Snead, Craig Stadler, Payne Stewart, Curtis Strange, Mike Sullivan, Hal Sutton, Brian Tennyson, Doug Tewell, Leonard Thompson, Bob Tway, Greg Twiggs, Howard Twitty, Scott Verplank, Bobby Wadkins, Lanny Wadkins, Denis Watson, Tom Watson, D. A. Weibring, Mark Wiebe, Robert Wrenn, Fuzzy Zoeller, Richard Zokol

Round summaries

First round
Thursday, March 16, 1989

Source:

Second round
Friday, March 17, 1989

Source:

Third round
Saturday, March 18, 1989

Source:

Final round
Sunday, March 19, 1989

References

External links
The Players Championship website

1989
1989 in golf
1989 in American sports
1989 in sports in Florida
March 1989 sports events in the United States